The IRS class of tugboats are a series of Bollard pull tugboats built by Hindustan Shipyard Limited, Visakhapatnam, for the Indian Navy.

INS Sahas and INS Dhiraj tugs were flagged off by Commander (retd) K.S. Subramanian, the Director (shipbuilding) and INS Himmat was flagged off by Rear Admiral (Retd) N K Mishra, NM Chairman & Managing Director of HSL. The vessels were built under special survey of IRS Steel ship rules and as such were assigned with IRS class notation. Contracts for 4 additional similar tugboats were signed between HSL and Indian Navy in November 2019. The keel of the first two tugboats Veeran and Balaram were laid on November 15, 2019.

Specifications
Bollard pull of all the vessels is in excess of 54 tonnes almost 10% in excess of specifications.

Service history
INS Himmat, INS Sahas and INS Dhiraj serve with the Western Naval Command at Karwar. These vessels are primarily meant to handle the aircraft carrier  which is based in Karwar since early 2014.

Boats in the class

See also
Tugboats of the Indian Navy

References

 
Auxiliary ships of the Indian Navy
Tugs of the Indian Navy
Auxiliary tugboat classes